Naberezhnaya Tower (literally means Tower on the Embankment) is an office complex composed of two skyscrapers and a high-rise located on plot 10 in the Moscow International Business Center (MIBC) in Moscow, Russia with a total area of . The buildings are named after the first three letters of the alphabet and from the lowest height to the tallest: the 17-story tall Tower A, the 27-story tall Tower B, and the 59-story tall Tower C. Construction of the complex started in 2003, with Tower A being completed in 2004, Tower B in 2005, and Tower C in 2007.

It is formerly the tallest building in Russia and Europe, surpassing the Triumph Palace, also in Moscow, in August 2007. Tower C was surpassed by its neighboring skyscraper Moscow Tower of the City of Capitals complex as the tallest building in July 2008.

History 

In the summer of 2003, the Turkish company Enka started construction of the 17-story Tower A, designed by architects Inan Vehbi and Ertürk Olcay. Since the Naberezhnaya Tower was divided into three stages, Enka was able to start construction earlier, postponing construction of the tallest building in the complex, Tower C. Tower A became the first building completed in the central area of the MIBC. Due to the demand, the developer managed to sell all of available office space 4 months before the opening of Tower A.

By the beginning of 2007, when the Naberezhnaya Tower was still the only operating complex in the central area of the MIBC, Tower A and Tower B were occupied by about 40 companies, including Alcoa, Citibank, IBM, GE, KPMG, Lucent, and Procter & Gamble. However, tenants faced the underdeveloped infrastructure of the MIBC that was currently under construction and the fact that 7,000 of their workers only have 1200 parking spaces in a 4-level underground parking lot.

Construction of Tower C started in 2005, way later than Tower A and Tower B. It was completed in 2007. Tower C kept its rank until the neighboring Moscow Tower of the City of Capitals complex surpassed it in July 2008 as the tallest in Russia and Europe.

Possessing its own production base, Enka did not use a loan and built the Naberezhnaya Tower using its own funds. The total investment is estimated at $200 million. By the beginning of the Great Recession, almost all the areas in the complex had already been opened.

Construction gallery

See also 

List of tallest buildings in Moscow
List of tallest buildings in Russia
List of tallest buildings in EuropeList of tallest structures in the former Soviet Union

References

External links 

 

Moscow International Business Center
Office buildings completed in 2004
Office buildings completed in 2005
Office buildings completed in 2007
Skyscraper office buildings in Moscow
Residential skyscrapers in Moscow